Seshathetep (meaning "Seshat is satisfied"), also called Heti, was an ancient Egyptian official at the beginning of the Fifth Dynasty. Seshathetep held many important titles, possibly including that of vizier. With this latter title, he would have been the most important official at the royal court, second only to the king. He also bore the title of king's son of his body, yet it is doubtful that Seshathetep was the real son of a king.

Before becoming vizier, Seshathetep was overseer of all royal works. Seshathetep is mainly known to us from his tomb at Giza.  His tomb is a mastaba with a chapel on the south-east side. The chapel is fully decorated and relatively well preserved. Also depicted in the tomb are his wife Merites, one son who was also called Seshathetep and another son called Heti. The title of vizier is not recorded on the tomb walls but appears on a statue unearthed in the mastaba. This suggests that he was promoted to this high office after the decoration of the tomb was finished. However, the statue in question, which shows a couple, is damaged and the names of the people represented have been lost. Therefore, some scholars argue that the statue belongs to different people and that Seshathetep may not have been a vizier.

References

Literature 

Viziers of the Fifth Dynasty of Egypt